Doris Dowling (May 15, 1923 – June 18, 2004) was an American actress of film, stage and television. Best known for the films The Crimson Key (1946) and Bitter Rice (1949). Also known for playing Irene Adams on My Living Doll (1964-1965) and other TV show appearances such as The Andy Griffith Show, Perry Mason,  The Incredible Hulk.

Early years
Dowling was born in Detroit, Michigan, but grew up in New York City with siblings Robert, Richard, and Constance (who also became an actress). After graduating from Hunter College High School, she spent a short time with a Folies Bergère group in San Francisco before her mother brought her back to New York to attend Hunter College.

Film
After her time as a chorus girl on Broadway, Dowling followed her elder sister Constance to Hollywood. Her first credited film role was that of Gloria, an apparent escort who takes a shine to Ray Milland in the 1945 film The Lost Weekend.

She next appeared in The Blue Dahlia, which starred Alan Ladd and Veronica Lake. Dowling portrayed Ladd's wife but was six inches taller so Ladd stood on ramps or boxes or, in many of their scenes together she was either sitting or lying down.

As work grew scarce after the war, she emigrated to Italy to revive her career as her sister had done.

In Italy, Dowling starred in several acclaimed films, including Bitter Rice. She appeared in Orson Welles's European production of Othello in 1951, playing Bianca.

Back in the United States, she returned to film in Running Target (1956) and appeared in the 1977 production The Car.

Television
Upon returning to the United States, much of Dowling's work was in theater and on television. She appeared in such television shows as One Step Beyond, Have Gun – Will Travel, Mickey Spillane's Mike Hammer, Cheyenne, Alfred Hitchcock Presents, Science Fiction Theater, Adam 12, Bonanza, Perry Mason, The Andy Griffith Show and, late in her career, Kojak, Barnaby Jones, The Incredible Hulk, and The Dukes of Hazzard. She co-starred with Bob Cummings and Julie Newmar in the sitcom My Living Doll.

Stage
Dowling shared the Outer Critics Circle Award for Best Ensemble Performance in 1972 - 1973 for her performance in a revival of The Women on Broadway. Her other Broadway credits include Panama Hattie (1942), Banjo Eyes (1942), Beat the Band (1942), and New Faces of 1943 (1943).

Personal life
Dowling dated Billy Wilder during the 1940s and married three times. In 1952, she became bandleader Artie Shaw's seventh wife. They had a son, Jonathan, before divorcing in 1956. Later that year, on April 27, 1956, Dowling married film executive Robert F. Blumofe; they divorced in 1959.  She married Leonard Kaufman on April 20, 1960, to whom she remained married until her death in 2004.

Death
Dowling died at Cedars-Sinai Medical Center in Los Angeles, California, on June 18, 2004, at age 81. She is buried at Holy Cross Cemetery, Culver City, California.

Filmography

References

Demetria Fulton; previewed Dowling in Barnaby Jones in the episode titled, "The Last Contract" (12/31/1974).

External links

 
 

1923 births
2004 deaths
American film actresses
American stage actresses
American television actresses
Actresses from Detroit
20th-century American actresses
American expatriates in Italy
Burials at Holy Cross Cemetery, Culver City
21st-century American women